Raúl Alfonso Aguayo Saladín (born April 9, 1981 in Santo Domingo) is Dominican Republic sailor. He represented the Dominican Republic in the 2008 Summer Olympic Games in the Sailing category.

Notes

References

External links
 
 
 
 Raul Aguayo's official site

1981 births
Living people
Dominican Republic male sailors (sport)
Olympic sailors of the Dominican Republic
Sailors at the 2008 Summer Olympics – Laser
Pan American Games bronze medalists for the Dominican Republic
Sailors at the 2003 Pan American Games
Sportspeople from Santo Domingo
Pan American Games medalists in sailing
Central American and Caribbean Games silver medalists for the Dominican Republic
Competitors at the 2010 Central American and Caribbean Games
Central American and Caribbean Games medalists in sailing
Medalists at the 2003 Pan American Games
White Dominicans